Louletano Desportos Clube is a Portuguese club from Loulé, founded on 6 June 1923. The association football team currently play in the Campeonato Nacional de Seniores (Portuguese fourth level), H series.

The club plays at the Estádio Algarve, a stadium which it shared with Sporting Clube Farense between 2004 and 2013, when that club moved back to a renovated Estádio de São Luís.

Current squad

Notes

External links
 Official site 
 Squad at Zerozero
 Squad at ForaDeJogo 

Football clubs in Portugal
Association football clubs established in 1923
1923 establishments in Portugal
Sport in Loulé
Liga Portugal 2 clubs